Darrell Earnest Fitton is an English electronic musician from Rochdale, England. Most of his work is recorded under the monikers Bola and Jello, released primarily on Skam Records. Fitton has also contributed to electronic acts D-Breeze, Brahma and Ooblo, and Autechre's Gescom project. Fitton was rumoured to have left the music industry in November 2007, but in 2017 he released the album D.E.G.

Biography
Fitton loaned equipment to Autechre in their early days and his first noteworthy involvement with electronic music was as assistant on their debut album Incunabula. His own first electronic music release came in 1994, on Warp's Artificial Intelligence II compilation. In 1995 he returned with the now more familiar Bola moniker, releasing the 1 12" on Skam Records. In 1996, he recorded the album Plink with Dennis Bourne and Wayne Edwards as Brahma. However, Fitton left the band to pursue his career as Bola. He and Dennis would later collaborate again on the tracks "Mauver" and "Pae Paoe". The debut album as Bola, Soup, came in 1998 and was described as "an impressive synthesis of the machine-beat ambiance (sic) of post-techno with warm, wistful analog soul". A rare set of 3 EPs called Shapes was released in 2000, pressed at only 300 copies; in September 2006, it was remastered and reissued in greater numbers by Skam, adding three bonus tracks.

On 2 January 2013, Fitton addressed the rumours of his retirement, stating "I figure 5 years of relative inactivity is an adequate musical absence. New music will be produced and released this year."

The latest Bola album, D.E.G. - short for Darrell Earnest is Gone - was issued in 2017. There have been occasional live performances, the most recent of which was in December 2012 at Adapter's Vertigo IV in Eindhoven.

Albums released as Bola are generally titled in a way that forms a play on words with Bola, e.g. Soup (Bowl of Soup), Mauver (Bowl 'em over), Fyuti (Footballer), Gnayse (Bolognaise), Kroungrine (Crown Green Bowler), D.E.G. (Boiled Egg).

In 2017, Darrell Fitton was interviewed by the Data.Wave webzine.

Style
Fitton's blend of electronica, jazz-influenced keyboard parts and ambient soundscapes has been described as "equally informed by the expansive emotions of electronica together with sensible melodies and cinematic atmospheres." "Bola travels in decidedly cinematic realms, crafting music that begs for emotional, tactile responses, ranging from sadness to fear to suspense," opined Tim DiGravina in a review of Fyuti for AllMusic. "All of this emotional manipulation is done through extended synth notes, pristine keyboards, and shimmering, otherworldly electronic elements."

While frequently described as "cinematic", Fitton's music has been noted as employing harsher, less accessible elements such as "austere synth textures and almost industrial-grade distortion". "Bola's work needs time to work its magic," states the Electronic Music Guide. "A patient listener will be hugely rewarded".

Discography

Albums 
 Bola  – Soup, 1998 (Skam). 12" (SKALP002), CD (SKALD002), 2LP (SKALD002LP). Remastered and reissued with new artwork in 2003.
 Bola  – Fyuti, 2001 (Skam). 12" (SKALP007), CD (SKALD007), Picture Disc (SKALPD007).
 Jello – Voile, 2002 (Peacefrog). 12" (PFG016LP), CD (PFG016CD).
 Bola  – Gnayse, 2004 (Skam). 12" (SKALP015), CD (SKALD015), 2LP (SKALD015LP).
 Bola  – Shapes, 2006 (Skam). CD (SKALD020). Remastered and re-issued version of the Shapes EP, plus 3 bonus tracks.
 Bola  – Kroungrine 2007 (Skam). CD (SKALD022), 2LP (SKALP022).
 Bola  – D.E.G. 2017 (Skam). CD (SKALD034), 2LP (SKALP034).

Singles and EPs 
 Bola  – 1, 1995 (Skam). 12" (SKA005).
 Bola  – KS, 1998 (Skam). 7" (KMAS002).
 Bola  – Mauver, 2000 (Skam). 12" (SKA015).
 Bola  – Shapes, 2000 (Skam). 12". 300 copies only.
 Bola  – Pae Paoe, 2001 (Skam). 7" (KMAS007).
 Jello – Chamchimzee, 2002 (Peacefrog). 12" (PFG022).
 Jello – Lungbone, 2003 (Peacefrog). 12" (PFG028), CD (PFG028CD).

Remixes
 Lamb – Softly (Bola remix), 1999 (Fontana). CD (562 372-2)
 Aqualung – Strange and Beautiful (I Put a Spell on You) (Cassan Vae), 2002 (B-Unique Records). CD (bun032cdx)
 Bass Communion – Macrovelux Deluxremux, 2003 (Headphone Dust). CD (BCCD5)
 Martin L. Gore – Loverman (Bola remix), 2003 (Mute). 12" (12 MUTE 322), DVD-V (12 MUTE 322), CD (CDMUTE322)
 Ektoise – Lmenitemix (Bola), 2010 (777 Operations). CD (7770011), 7" (7770012)

References

External links
 Bola Facebook page
 



Year of birth missing (living people)
Living people
English electronic musicians
Musicians from Manchester
Intelligent dance musicians